Caishen is the mythological figure worshipped in the Chinese folk religion and Taoism. He has been identified with many historical figures, viewed as his embodied forms, among whom Zhao Gongming (Wade–Giles: Chao Kung-ming; also known as Zhao Gong Yuanshuai  "Lord Zhao the Marshal"), Fan Li, and Bi Gan. A large temple of Caishen has been built in the 2000s in Zhouzhi, Xi'an, Shaanxi.

Caishen's name is often invoked during the Chinese New Year celebrations. He is often depicted riding a black tiger and holding a golden rod. He may also be depicted with an iron tool capable of turning stone and iron into gold.

Historical personages

Several versions of Caishen's incarnations' political affiliation and way of deification are circulated. It is unclear whether they are genuine historical figures, though most of the stories agree that Caishen's most popular incarnation lived during the early Qin dynasty. Most probably it represents the merging of several heterogeneous legends, the one of Bi Gan being the most ancient. 

Legend has it that Bi Gan had a wife with the surname Chen. His son was Quan. After Bi Gan was put to death by his nephew King Zhou of Shang, Bi Gan's wife and son escaped into the woods. His death eventually marked the collapse of the Shang dynasty. Later on, Quan was honoured as the ancestor of all Lins by King Wu of Zhou.

Notwithstanding the above, there is another legendary character of the Chinese God of Wealth which is generally known as Caibo Xingjun amongst Chinese communities. Li Guizu was born in the Zichuan District in Shandong Province and held position as a country magistrate. Li Guizu contributed significantly to the district, whilst people built a temple to worship Li Guizu after his death. The late Li Guizu was then conferred the title Caibo Xingjun by the Wude Emperor of Tang dynasty.

The Caishen of all directions  

Caishen sometimes appears as a door god in Chinese and Taoist temples, usually in partnership with the Burning-Lamp Taoist.

Buddhism
Though Caishen is a Chinese folk deity, many Pure Land Buddhists venerate him as a buddha. In esoteric Buddhist schools he is identified as Jambhala.

Notes

External links 
 

Chinese gods
Fortune gods
Holiday characters
Deified Chinese people